Mater Ecclesiae (Mother of the Church) Abbey is an Italian Benedictine territorial abbey of nuns founded in 1973. The abbey is located on Lake Orta in northern Italy, considered one of the most scenic sites in the country.

History
By 1973 the community of Benedictine nuns of the Abbey of Viboldone, near Milan, which had been established in 1941 to care for the needy children of wartime Italy, had grown to the point that they considered opening a new foundation. They were offered the facilities of the former bishop's residence on San Giulio Island for this, which they accepted.

Six nuns were chosen to undertake this enterprise, under the direction of Mother Anna Maria Cànopi, O.S.B., who was appointed as the first prioress of the new monastery. Within fifteen years the small community had expanded so much that new quarters were needed. They then transferred to the former diocesan seminary in the center of the little island, which was a massive complex built around 1840. At that time, the monastery was raised to the status of an abbey, with Cànopi being elected as the community's first abbess.

The community had grown to over 80 members by 1989, and it was decided to establish a new foundation. For this site, they chose the village of Saint-Oyen, in the Aosta Valley, where they opened the Monastery of Regina Pacis (Latin for Queen of Peace). As of 2006 they numbered about fifteen nuns.

The community of Mater Eccesliae has continued to flourish and today numbers about 100 nuns.

Crafts
The nuns of Mater Ecclesiae Abbey support themselves through their work in creating and repairing liturgical vestments and accessories, in writing icons and making translations from German and French spiritual books. Through their research they have developed a reputation for the quality of their restoration work with antique items.

Additionally, Cànopi, the abbess, has become a noted spiritual writer.

References

20th-century Christian monasteries
Benedictine nunneries in Italy
Christian organizations established in 1973
1973 establishments in Italy
Buildings and structures in Orta San Giulio
Territorial abbeys